Later... with Jools Holland is a contemporary British music television show hosted by Jools Holland. A spin-off of The Late Show, it has been running in short series since 1992 and is a part of BBC Two's late-night line-up, usually at around 11pm to midnight. It is usually recorded on a Tuesday for Friday broadcast and features a mixture of both established and new musical artists, from solo performers to bands and larger ensembles. In recent years, a live Tuesday version, featuring the same artists as the following weekend's programme, has been transmitted in a half-hour BBC2 slot.


See also
List of performers on Later with Jools Holland
Jools' Annual Hootenanny

Notes

References

BBC programme links

External links 

Lists of British non-fiction television series episodes